Turn Back the Clock is the debut studio album by English band Johnny Hates Jazz, released by Virgin Records on 11 January 1988 in United Kingdom and on 29 March 1988 in the United States. The album, whose most famous single was "Shattered Dreams", peaked at number one on the UK Albums Chart and at number 56 on the US Billboard 200. Kim Wilde sings backing vocals on the title track, which reached number 12 on the UK Singles Chart and number 10 in New Zealand. The track "Foolish Heart" was originally released as a single in 1986 as "Me and My Foolish Heart".

The song "Listen", written and co-produced by Phil Thornalley, was later re-recorded for his solo album Swamp, also released in 1988.

Track listing
All songs written by Clark Datchler, except where noted.

Standard version
1988 original vinyl album and US CD release
"Shattered Dreams" – 3:26
"Heart of Gold" – 3:20
"Turn Back the Clock" – 4:30
"Don't Say It's Love" – 3:43
"What Other Reason" – 3:20
"I Don't Want to Be a Hero" – 3:37
"Listen" – 3:44 (Phil Thornalley)
"Different Seasons" – 3:31 (Clark Datchler, Calvin Hayes)
"Don't Let It End This Way" – 3:40
"Foolish Heart" – 3:33 (Iain Macdonald, C. Hayes, M. Nocito, P. Thornalley)

Bonus tracks
1988 CD release
"Heart of Gold" (J. Mendelsohn Mix) – 6:41
"Turn Back the Clock" (J. Mendelsohn Mix) – 7:03
"I Don't Want to Be a Hero" (Extended Mix) – 6:36

2008 UK remastered edition
"Shattered Dreams" (12" Extended Mix) – 5:11
"Heart of Gold" (Extended Mix) – 6:42
"Turn Back the Clock" (12" Extended Mix) – 7:03
"Don't Say It's Love" (Extended Mix) – 6:36
"Foolish Heart" (12" Mix) – 5:50
"Turn Back the Clock" (Unreleased Version) – 4:35

Personnel 
Credits adapted from the liner notes of Turn Back the Clock.

Johnny Hates Jazz 
 Clark Datchler – lead vocals and backing vocals
 Calvin Hayes – bass
 Mike Nocito – synthesizers and drum machine

Additional musicians 

 Peter-John Vettese – additional 
 Chris Newman – Fairlight CMI
 J.J. Belle – electric guitar
 Neil Hubbard – electric guitar
 Frank Ricotti – percussions
 Molly Duncan – saxophones
 Neil Sidewell – trombone 
 Martin Drover – trumpets
 Anne Dudley – string arrangement on "Turn Back the Clock"
 Stevie Lange – backing vocals
 Miriam Stockley – backing vocals
 Kim Wilde – backing vocals

Production 

 Calvin Hayes – producer
 Mike Nocito – producer, engineer
 Phil Thornalley – co-producer on "Listen", mixing
 Greg Jackman – mixing
 Bob Kraushaar – mixing
 Julian Mendelsohn – mixing
 Matt Barry – assistant engineer
 Richard Edwards – assistant engineer 
 Terry Irwin – assistant engineer 
 Roy Spong – assistant engineer
 Tim Weidner – assistant engineer
 Kevin Metcalfe – mastering
 Sarm West Studios (London, UK) – mixing location 
 The Townhouse (London, UK) – mastering location

Artwork 
 Stylorouge – design, art direction
 Simon Fowler – photography

Charts

Weekly charts

Year-end charts

Certifications

References

1988 debut albums
Albums recorded at RAK Studios
Johnny Hates Jazz albums
Virgin Records albums